Yasenok is a rural locality in Verkhnelyubazhsky Selsoviet Rural Settlement, Fatezhsky District, Kursk Oblast, Russia. Population:

Geography 
The village is located on the Yasenok River (a right tributary of the Svapa River), 106 km from the Russia–Ukraine border, 66 km north-west of Kursk, 21 km north-west of the district center – the town Fatezh, 7 km from the selsoviet center – Verkhny Lyubazh.

 Climate
Yasenok has a warm-summer humid continental climate (Dfb in the Köppen climate classification).

Transport 
Yasenok is located 1.5 km from the federal route  Crimea Highway (a part of the European route ), 20 km from the route  (a part of the European route ), on the road of intermunicipal significance  (M2 "Crimea Highway" – Yasenok), 23 km from the nearest railway station Kurbakinskaya (railway line Arbuzovo – Luzhki-Orlovskiye).

The rural locality is situated 67.5 km from Kursk Vostochny Airport, 188 km from Belgorod International Airport and 241 km from Voronezh Peter the Great Airport.

References

Notes

Sources

Rural localities in Fatezhsky District